The 2017–18 FAW Women's Cup is the 26th edition of the FAW Women's Cup, the premier knock-out cup competition for women's association football teams in Wales.

Swansea City won the final 2–1 over Cardiff City.

Format
The tournament is a single-elimination knock-out tournament, with eight teams entering in the qualifying round and the remaining 28 receiving a bye to the first round proper.

Calendar

Results

Qualifying round
The draw for the qualifying round took place at the FAW's headquarters in Cardiff on 12 July. All four matches were originally scheduled to take place on Sunday 17 September 2017.

First round
The first round draw was held on 18 September, again at the FAW's headquarters in Cardiff. The ties were all played on Sunday 8 October 2017, except the Caerphilly Castle v Newcastle Emlyn and Abergavenny v Penybont games, which were both cancelled and the wins awarded to the home teams.

Second round
Drawn on 10 October.

Quarter-finals
The draw was made on 13 November live on the FAW Facebook page.

Semi-finals
The draw was made on 5 February, with matches originally scheduled to be played on 4 March at neutral venues. Cardiff City and Abergavenny both were reinstated into the competition, having originally been eliminated by Cardiff Met in the second round and quarter-final respectively, after it had emerged that The Archers had fielded two under-aged players in the game against Cardiff City. City then beat Abergavenny in a replayed quarter final to take a place in the semi-finals.

Final

References

External links
FAW Cups on the Football Association of Wales website.
Video of the qualifying round draw, published on YouTube by the Football Association of Wales.

2017–18 in Welsh women's football
FAW Women's Cup
Women